Samy Frioui (born 7 September 1991) is an Algerian footballer who currently plays as a striker for Al-Khaldiya SC in Bahrain.

Club career
Samy Frioui was born on September 7, 1991 in Kouba, a district located east of Algiers. He began playing football in the youth categories of USM Alger. He made a few sporadic appearances in the first team, before finally integrating the senior workforce during the 2013-2014 season, taking advantage of the decision of Rolland Courbis, then coach of USMA, not to carry out any recruitment during the transfer window. summer and instead promote five club prospects. Frioui scored a goal during his first start in a derby against USM El Harrach. but failed to win in the team since he only took part in six games in a season that sees USMA win the championship. Not appearing in the list of players selected for the 2014-2015 financial year, the young striker left the Rouge et Noir and joined USM El Harrach on loan for one season on June 23, 2014. Transferred to JSM Béjaïa in 2015, Frioui joined USM Blida still in D2, in 2016. Promoted to Division 1 in 2017, he scored 15 goals in the elite during the 2017-20184 season . This good season earned him an arrival in Europe and On June 8, 2018, Frioui signed a 3-years contract with AEL. On December 14, 2018, Frioui left the club by mutual agreement, without having played any official league game.
In 2018, he joined MC Alger.

Career statistics

Club

Honours

Club
 USM Alger
 Ligue Professionnelle 1: 2013–14
Arab Club Champions Cup: 2012–13
Algerian Cup: 2012–13
 Super Cup: 2013

References

Living people
1991 births
Athlitiki Enosi Larissa F.C. players
Algerian footballers
Algerian Ligue Professionnelle 1 players
Algerian Ligue 2 players
Algerian expatriates in Greece
Association football forwards
Expatriate footballers in Greece
JSM Béjaïa players
People from Kouba
USM Alger players
USM Blida players
Footballers from Algiers
USM El Harrach players
21st-century Algerian people